"Fancy Like" is a song recorded by American country music singer Walker Hayes. It was released on August 2, 2021, from his fifth EP Country Stuff via Monument Records Nashville. Hayes co-wrote the song with Cameron Bartolini, Josh Jenkins, and Shane Stevens, and co-produced it with Joe Thibodeau and Shane McAnally. A remix featuring guest vocals from American singer-songwriter Kesha was released on September 10, 2021.

Background
During the COVID-19 pandemic, Hayes and his family decided to make TikTok videos for fun, creating dances for several songs from his EP Country Stuff for his children, including "Country Stuff" and "I Hope You Miss Me". The TikTok video for "Fancy Like" has received more than 2.4 million likes and 23,000 comments, and became a popular meme which led to the song becoming a viral hit.

In an interview with CMT, he said: "It's nice to know when you put out something that honestly, I just wrote about my family. There's no pretentiousness there. It's just who we are. When you get to be that honest and the public reacts, it's a real magical thing. And the dances, that's just me being a dad. I mean, that's just how we roll around here."

Music videos
The song received two music video releases. The original version, depicting Hayes singing the song around a house and meadow, was released on June 4, 2021. The remix version with Kesha was released on October 7, 2021, and directed by Rehman Ali. The video was filmed In Los Angeles. It features Hayes and Kesha "in a 'Fancy Like' world of their own – tailgating, skateboarding, and dancing through the streets of LA."

Track listings
Digital download and streaming (Remix featuring Kesha and original)
 "Fancy Like" (feat. Kesha) - 2:41
 "Fancy Like" - 2:41

Digital download and streaming (Dave Audé remix)
 "Fancy Like" (Dave Audé remix) - 2:57

Commercial performance
After Hayes posted a series of videos on TikTok with his children, the song sold 10,300 copies in the week ending June 17, 2021. It reached number three on the US Billboard Hot 100 and number one on the Hot Country Songs chart, becoming Hayes' first top 10 and highest-charting single to date. On August 9, 2021, the track was certified Gold by the RIAA and platinum on September 7, 2021.

In response to the song's popularity, Applebee's brought back its Oreo Cookie Shake, which was mentioned in the song and had been discontinued in the wake of the COVID-19 pandemic. The chain used the song in commercials starting August 23, 2021.

Charts

Weekly charts

Year-end charts

Certifications

Release history

References

2021 songs
2021 singles
Walker Hayes songs
Kesha songs
Monument Records singles
Song recordings produced by Shane McAnally
Country rap songs
Songs written by Kesha